The 1939–40 Yugoslav Ice Hockey League season was the fourth season of the Yugoslav Ice Hockey League, the top level of ice hockey in Yugoslavia. Four teams participated in the league, and Ilirija have won the championship.

Teams
Ilirija
ZKD Zagreb
Marathon Zagreb
HAŠK Zagreb

Qualification
6.1. Palić – VŠD ?:?
7.1. Marathon Zagreb – Palić 8:3

Tournament

Semifinals
13.1.1940 Ilirija – Marathon Zagreb 4–1 (0–0, 3–0, 1–1)
13.1.1940 ZKD Zagreb – HAŠK Zagreb 4–2 (1–0, 0–1, 3–1)

3rd place
14.1.1940 Marathon Zagreb – HAŠK Zagreb 5–4 (0–1, 2–2, 3–1)

Final
14.1.1940 Ilirija Ljubljana – ZKD Zagreb 5–0 (3–0, 1–0, 1–0)

Final ranking
Ilirija
ZKD Zagreb
Marathon Zagreb
HAŠK Zagreb

Champions
Ice Rihar, Luce Žitnik, Jule Kačič, Kroupa, Oto Gregorčič, Jože Gogala, Mirko Eržen, Karel Pavletič, Ernest Aljančič, Viljem Morbacher.

References

External links
Yugoslav Ice Hockey League seasons

Yugo
Yugoslav Ice Hockey League seasons
1939–40 in Yugoslav ice hockey